Kinesin family member 7 (KIF7), also known as kinesin-4, is a human protein encoded by the gene KIF7. It is part of the kinesin family of motor proteins.

Function 
KIF7 depolymerises the growing plus-end of microtubules, and is involved in regulating Hedgehog signalling.

References 

Motor proteins